In Case You're in Love is the third studio album by American pop duo Sonny & Cher, released in 1967 by Atco Records.

Album information
The song "Little Man" was the first single released from the album, and was perhaps their most successful single in Europe, peaking at #1 in five European countries. It is, however, to be noted that it never topped the UK chart as it peaked at number 4 there. The song was less successful in the US, where it reached #21. The next single released was the minor hit "Living for You" and the third single was the huge hit "The Beat Goes On". It became their third top ten song in the US, peaking at #6.

The album is largely a collection of cover songs including "Stand by Me" (originally by Ben E. King) and "We'll Sing in the Sunshine"). In the album there are also two songs performed by Bono, "Misty Roses" and "Cheryl's Goin' Home". Both are now available in the 1999 bonus track of the solo Bono album Inner Views.

Track listing
All songs written by Sonny Bono, except where noted.

Side A
"The Beat Goes On" - 3:23
"Groovy Kind of Love" (Carole Bayer Sager, Toni Wine) - 2:20
"You Baby" (Barry Mann, Phil Spector, Cynthia Weil) - 2:45
"Monday" - 2:55
"Love Don't Come" - 3:05
"Podunk" - 2:53

Side B
"Little Man" - 3:15
"We'll Sing in the Sunshine" (Gale Garnett) - 2:40
"Misty Roses" (Tim Hardin) - 3:05
"Stand by Me" (Ben E. King, Jerry Leiber, Mike Stoller) - 3:40
"Living for You" - 3:30
"Cheryl's Goin' Home" (Bob Lind) - 2:40

Charts

Personnel
Cher - vocals
Sonny Bono - vocals
Harold Battiste, Mac Rebbenack, Michel Rubini - piano
Frank Capp, Jim Gordon, Nick Pelico - drums
Carol Kaye, Lyle Ritz - bass
Barney Kessel, David Cohen - guitar
Gene Daniello, Stanley H. Ross, Robert West, Sydney K. Allison, Leland Postil, William Green, Louis Blackburn, Frederick Hill, Melvin Moore - other

Production
Harold Battiste - conductor
Sonny Bono - arrangements, producer
Bob Irwin - mastering
Stan Ross - engineer

Design
Haig Adishian - design
Jud Cost - liner notes
Jerry Schatzberg - cover photography 
Hens J. Hoffman - graphic layout
Ward Lamb - liner notes, graphic layout
Rich Russell - package design

References

1967 albums
Sonny & Cher albums
Atco Records albums
Atlantic Records albums
Albums produced by Sonny Bono
Albums arranged by Sonny Bono
Albums conducted by Harold Battiste
Albums recorded at Gold Star Studios